The 1945 Norwegian Football Cup was the 40th season of the Norwegian annual knockout football tournament. This was the first cup in five years, due to  the Second World War. The tournament was open for all members of NFF, except those from Northern Norway. The final was contested by the defending champions Fredrikstad and the four-time former winners Lyn. It took two replays to decide a winner, and in the third final Lyn won 4–0 securing their fifth title and the first title in 34 years, having last won in 1911.

First round

|-
|colspan="3" style="background-color:#97DEFF"|Replay

|}

Second round

|-
|colspan="3" style="background-color:#97DEFF"|Replay

|}

Third round

|colspan="3" style="background-color:#97DEFF"|2 September 1945

|-
|colspan="3" style="background-color:#97DEFF"|Replay: 9 September 1945

|-
|colspan="3" style="background-color:#97DEFF"|2nd replay: 13 September 1945

|}

Fourth round

|colspan="3" style="background-color:#97DEFF"|16 September 1945

|-
|colspan="3" style="background-color:#97DEFF"|Replay: 19 September 1945

|}

Quarter-finals

|colspan="3" style="background-color:#97DEFF"|23 September 1945

|}

Semi-finals

|colspan="3" style="background-color:#97DEFF"|30 September 1945

|}

Final

First match

Replay match

Second replay match

See also
1945 in Norwegian football

References

Norwegian Football Cup seasons
Norway
Cup